Mae A. Schunk (née Gasparac; born May 21, 1934) is an American politician and educator from Minnesota who served as the 45th lieutenant governor of Minnesota from 1999 to 2003. Elected on the same ticket as Jesse Ventura in the historic upset election of 1998 Minnesota gubernatorial election, she became the first Reform Party member elected as lieutenant governor of any state.

Biography
Prior to her tenure as lieutenant governor, she was a teacher for 37 years. In his memoir, Ventura mentioned that he chose her to "balance out all the testosterone." During her term in office, she visited schools throughout the state and frequently read to students as part of her efforts to encourage literacy and appreciation for reading among young people.

In the 2000 presidential campaign, as polls showed Texas Governor George W. Bush and U.S. Vice President Al Gore tied in Minnesota within 2 weeks of Election Day, Schunk endorsed Gore at a rally held on Nicollet Avenue in downtown Minneapolis while Ventura committed himself to a third-party candidate, John Hagelin. Later, in an interview with CNN, Ventura commented that Schunk had asked him before making the endorsement and that he had consented to her decision.

Born to Croatian parents, Schunk lives with her husband, William Schunk in Inver Grove Heights, Minnesota; they have a son, Benjamin Schunk. Schunk was educated at the University of Wisconsin-Eau Claire.

Electoral history
1998 Race for Governor/Lieutenant Governor
Ventura/Schunk (Ref.), 37%
Coleman/Olson (R), 34%
Humphrey/Moe (DFL), 28%

See also

List of female lieutenant governors in the United States

References

External links
Minnesota Historical Society

1934 births
Lieutenant Governors of Minnesota
Living people
People from Inver Grove Heights, Minnesota
People from Greenwood, Wisconsin
American people of Croatian descent
Women in Minnesota politics
University of Wisconsin–Eau Claire alumni
Reform Party of the United States of America politicians
Independence Party of Minnesota politicians
Schoolteachers from Minnesota
American women educators
21st-century American women